Running Wild is a children's novel by Michael Morpurgo first published in 2009. It recounts the adventures of a boy who has to survive in the Indonesian jungle after being rescued from a tsunami by an elephant.

Plot summary
Running Wild by Michael Morpurgo starts with a boy, Will Robert, riding an elephant along a beach, whilst on holiday in Indonesia. Will is grieving for his father, Robert, who died in the Iraq War. The elephant, Oona, is in an odd mood that day: her handler mentions that she refused to go into the sea for her usual morning dip. Suddenly, Oona charges off with Will clinging on for dear life. As they ascend a hill, Will witnesses the Boxing Day tsunami obliterating the beach where he had been moments earlier.  Will is very sad.
 
Oona heads into the jungle with Will on her back, and Will gradually learns to communicate with her and finds fruit and water enabling him to survive in the wild. He also remembers a long-ago lesson from his father, who taught him how to catch fish from a stream using his clothing as a net. However, Will struggles with biting insects and leeches. One day, there is a standoff between Oona and a tiger, and Will remembers the poem "The Tyger" by William Blake. Saying this poem out loud gives Will courage. This courage is needed when Will is kidnapped by hunters, and finds out about threats to the rainforest through trade in exotic pets, animal furs, palm oil and timber. Later Will escapes with the help of a chef, Kaya, who frees them by cutting open their wooden cage, leaving Will and the orangutans to run back into the wild. They wander the rainforest until they run into Oona. Will is over joyed to find Oona and climbs on her back with the orangutans.

Inspiration
The idea for this book came from a newspaper article about Aamber Owen, who was saved from the 2004 tsunami by an elephant whom she was riding at the time. Morpurgo had not traced Owen until 2016, and invited her and her family to the opening night of the stage production in London. Morpurgo was also influenced by The Jungle Book and "The Elephant's Child", his two favourite stories from his childhood.

Reception
Writing in the Guardian, Linda Newbery says: “With its emphasis on animal instincts and social behaviour, Running Wild, part epic adventure, part plea for threatened habitats, will surely rank alongside his best-loved books.”

Stage adaptation
In 2016 Samuel Adamson adapted it for the stage, in a production at the Regent's Park Open Air Theatre.

References

2009 British novels
British children's novels
Novels by Michael Morpurgo
Novels set in Indonesia
Novels about survival skills
Children's novels about animals
2009 children's books
HarperCollins books
2004 Indian Ocean earthquake and tsunami
Fiction set in 2004